Hyperolius (commonly known as the African reed frogs or reed frogs) is a large genus of frogs in the family Hyperoliidae from Sub-Saharan Africa.

Species
Different sources may delimit species differently, and as new species are still being described, different number of species can be found. As of early 2022, Amphibian Species of the World lists 145 species and AmphibiaWeb 152 species. The following list follows the Amphibian Species of the World:

Nomina inquirenda
The following species are considered nomina inquirenda (species of doubtful identity):
 Rappia granulata Tornier, 1896
 Rappia fimbriata Tornier, 1896
 Hyperolius laticeps Ahl, 1931
 Hyperolius thoracotuberculatus Ahl, 1931

References

 
Hyperoliidae
Amphibians of Sub-Saharan Africa
Amphibian genera
Taxonomy articles created by Polbot